General Hugh Waddell ( – 9 April 1773) was an Irish-born American military officer in the Province of North Carolina prior to the American Revolutionary War. Waddell formed and led a provincial militia unit in Rowan County, North Carolina and the Ohio River Valley during the French and Indian War and the Anglo-Cherokee War, and supervised the construction of Fort Dobbs near the settlement of the Fourth Creek Congregation.  His career was well-served by close connections to several provincial governors of North Carolina.

Early life
Waddell was born  in Lisburn, County Down, Ireland, to Hugh and Isabella Brown Waddell who were of Ulster Protestant origin, although the exact date of his birth is unknown. As a family friend to the aristocrat Arthur Dobbs of County Antrim, who had just been appointed as Governor of North Carolina, Waddell was sent to the colonies in 1753 or 1754, and enlisted in the service of the acting Governor, Matthew Rowan, as a lieutenant.

French and Indian War career

In 1754, Waddell was sent to Virginia under the command of Colonel James Innes, who was commander-in-chief of all colonial forces then in Virginia under the authority of the governor of that state, Robert Dinwiddie.  After seeing no action, but having been promoted to captain, Waddell returned to North Carolina in late 1754, where he then spent a substantial portion of the early phase of the war that would go on to define his career as a commander supervising the construction, maintenance, and staffing of Fort Dobbs, near what is now Statesville, North Carolina.  In 1756, Waddell was recruited by Virginia's Lieutenant Governor Robert Dinwiddie to serve as a "Commissioner of Peace" to the Cherokee and Catawba tribes. Waddell was the sole representative of North Carolina in these negotiations, which secured the temporary cooperation of those tribes against the French and their native allies.

In 1758, Waddell, then a major, was called by General John Forbes to command a force of 300 rangers in the Forbes Expedition, with the goal of capturing Fort Duquesne. Initially acting as scouts and camp guards, Waddell's rangers were among several advanced units ambushed on 14 September 1758, by a raiding party of Shawnee and Delaware warriors. Waddell's unit successfully defended itself, although other units that were attacked simultaneously broke and fled.

On 12 November 1758, General Forbes ordered Colonel George Washington to command a force of Virginian and Carolinian troops to assault Fort Duquesne. Over the course of four days, Waddell and his troops fought off advanced groups of native French-allied warriors. By 24 November 1758, Waddell and his scouting force arrived to find that Fort Duquesne had been destroyed by the fleeing French soldiers, who had decided to abandon the fort in the face of the Forbes Expedition's methodical attack. After the conclusion of the Forbes Expedition, Waddell was given a Colonel's commission and, with his rangers, returned to Fort Dobbs to defend the Carolina territory against the increasingly belligerent Cherokee.

Anglo-Cherokee War

Waddell was stationed at Fort Dobbs on the night of 27 February 1760 when a force of Cherokee attacked the blockhouse. In the ensuing battle, which was the only battle that occurred at Fort Dobbs, between 10 and 12 Cherokee and two Provincial soldiers were wounded.

War of the Regulation
After the Treaty of Paris, Waddell led provincial militia in support of Governor William Tryon, and therefore against the "Regulation" movement during the War of the Regulation, although he did not take part in the Battle of Alamance due to having been encircled by Regulator militia near Salisbury, North Carolina.  Governor Tryon's march westward to confront the Regulators was, in part, due to his desire to lift the siege on General Waddell.

Later life, death, and reputation
Waddell served at various times in the North Carolina Legislature representing Rowan County, although his primary residences were in Bladen County and Brunswick County. Despite his prior allegiances to Governors Dobbs and Tryon, he was passed over for an appointment to North Carolina's Governor's Council, the primary advisory body to the colonial Governor. During this time, Waddell assisted in the establishment of a Sons of Liberty organization based around the Wilmington area, and participated in protests against the Stamp Act of 1765.  Waddell died after a prolonged battle with an illness on 9 April 1773, in Castle Hayne, North Carolina where he is buried.

Hugh Waddell served as a Captain with the Rowan County Regiment of the North Carolina militia during the American Revolution in 1776.  He was involved in the construction of Davidson's Fort in western North Carolina.

General Waddell was an ancestor of James Iredell Waddell, a Confederate captain during the Civil War, as well as Alfred Moore Waddell, a United States Congressman from North Carolina who wrote and published a biography of the General in 1890. In his biography, Alfred Waddell noted that the General had served longer in the military service of the crown than any other officer of the province, and as such was its most prominent soldier.

References

Notes

Bibliography

1734 births
1773 deaths
18th-century American politicians
Burials in North Carolina
Colonial American generals
Kingdom of Ireland emigrants to the Thirteen Colonies
Members of the North Carolina General Assembly
Military personnel from Lisburn
North Carolina militiamen in the American Revolution
People of North Carolina in the French and Indian War
Rowan County, North Carolina
People of colonial North Carolina